The 2007 Lethbridge municipal election was held Monday, October 15, 2007, to elect eight aldermen (at-large), the seven Lethbridge School District No. 51 trustees (at-large), and five of the Holy Spirit Roman Catholic Separate Regional Division No. 4's nine trustees (as Ward 2). The incumbent mayor had no challengers. Since 1968, provincial legislation has required every municipality to hold triennial elections. Of the 65,835 eligible voters, only 14,896 turned in a ballot, a voter turnout of 22.6%, and an average of 5.7 aldermen per ballot.

Results
Bold indicates elected, and incumbents are italicized.

Mayor

Aldermen

Public School Trustees

Separate School Trustees

References

Lethbridge
2007